Mark of the Devil Part II, or in original German Hexen geschändet und zu Tode gequält (lit. "Witches Are Violated and Tortured to Death"), is a German horror film released in 1973. It is a sequel to Mark of the Devil.

Plot
Young noblewoman Elisabeth von Salmenau (Erika Blanc) encounters a group of religious fanatics led by Balthasar von Ross (Anton Diffring) and his henchman Natas (Reggie Nalder). Her husband (Adrian Hoven) is killed and her young son Alexander (Percy Hoven) is deemed the devil's spawn. Elisabeth intends to plead the innocence of her son, but when she refuses Balthasar's advances, she is also deemed a heretic by the corrupt officials, and tortured.

Cast
 Erika Blanc - Elisabeth von Salmenau
 Anton Diffring - Balthasar von Ross
 Percy Hoven - Alexander von Salmenau
 Reggie Nalder - Natas
 Lukas Ammann - Eminence
 Jean-Pierre Zola - Nicholas
 Astrid Kilian - Clementine
 Ellen Umlauf - Abbess
 Rosemarie Heinikel - Pompanne (credited as Rosy Rosy)
 Dietrich Kerky - Father Melchior
 Johannes Buzalski - Advocate
 Adrian Hoven - Count Alexander von Salmenau

Production
Although sold as a sequel, the film has no real connection to the first film outside of a similar time period and instances of gratuitous torture. Reggie Nalder, who played the villain in the first film, co-stars here but plays a different character.

Release
The film was released theatrically in the United States by Hallmark Releasing, distributor of the first film, in 1974. It has been available on VHS in a multitude of releases from different companies, all varying in terms of the violent content, and never been officially released on DVD in the United States.

External links
 
 

1973 films
1973 horror films
Films about witchcraft
Films directed by Adrian Hoven
Films set in the 18th century
German horror films
1970s German-language films
German splatter films
West German films
Witch hunting in fiction
1970s German films